Harttia garavelloi is a species of armored catfish endemic to Brazil where it is found in the Fanado and Araçuaí rivers.  This species grows to a length of  SL.

The fish is named in honor of ichthyologist Julio Cesar Garavello, of the Universidade Federale de São Carlos, because of his work on neotropical freshwater fishes and for providing the paratypes for description.

References
 

garavelloi
Fish of South America
Fish of Brazil
Endemic fauna of Brazil
Taxa named by Osvaldo Takeshi Oyakawa 
Fish described in 1993